Trauma Center is an American medical drama that aired on ABC from September 22, 1983 to December 8, 1983.

In the run-up to the 1983–84 fall season, the series was promoted on-air and in the Fall Preview issue of TV Guide as Medstar, but was changed to Trauma Center prior to the first air-date.

Premise
The series followed the staff at Medstar Trauma Center, a special unit of the fictional McKee Hospital in Los Angeles County who dealt with numerous life-threatening medical incidents in each episode. The show also focused on two ambulance paramedics who often had to undertake unusual or dangerous actions in order to rescue injured people before delivering them to the Trauma Center.

Cast
 James Naughton as Dr. Michael 'Cutter' Royce
 Dorian Harewood as Dr. Nate 'Skate' Baylor
 Wendie Malick as Dr. Brigitte Blaine
 Bill Randolph as Dr. 'Beaver' Bouvier
 Eileen Heckart as Amy Decker, R.N.
 Arlen Dean Snyder as Dr. Charles Sternhouser 
 Alfie Wise as paramedic Sidney 'Hatter' Pacelli
 Lou Ferrigno as paramedic John Six
 Jack Bannon as pilot Buck Williams
 Jayne Modean as Nurse Hooter

US television ratings

Episodes

References

External links
 

1980s American drama television series
1980s American medical television series
1983 American television series debuts
1983 American television series endings
American Broadcasting Company original programming
English-language television shows
Television series by 20th Century Fox Television
Television series created by Glen A. Larson
Television shows set in Los Angeles